In phonetics, a lateral release is the release of a plosive consonant into a lateral consonant. While this is a minor phonetic detail in English (in fact, it is commonly transcribed as having no audible release:), it may be more important in other languages.

In the Hmong language, however, it is sometimes claimed that laterally-released consonants are unitary phonemes. According to Peter Ladefoged and Ian Maddieson, the choice between one or another analysis is purely based on phonological convenience—there is no actual acoustic or articulatory difference between one language's "laterally-released plosive" and another language's biphonemic cluster.

See also 
 Nasal release
 No audible release

References

Consonants